Ion V. "Jackie" Ionescu (born 2 May 1936 in Rudna) is a Romanian former football player and coach.

Career 
He played at Poli Timișoara (1953–1954), Progresul Sibiu (1955), Știința București (1956–1959) and Victoria București (1959–1960).

He coached: Poli Timișoara (1972–1975, 1980–1983, 1986–1988, 1991–1992, 1997–1999, 1999–2000), Jiul Petroșani (1975–1976), CFR Timișoara (1976–1977), UTA (1977–1979, 1996–1997), CSM Reșița (1979), Aurul Brad (1983–1984), Corvinul Hunedoara (1984–1986, 1990–1991), Sportul Studențesc (1988–1990), Progresul București (1993–1994).

As coach he won Cupa României with Politehnica Timişoara in 1980, and participated in the European Cup Winners Cup (1980) and UEFA cup (1992). He also coached the Romanian National Universities Soccer Team during their world cup win of the University Football World Cup in Monaco, 1974.

After retiring as a coach, he continued his career as advisor to Poli Timișoara (2005–2007), editorialist at various local and national sports papers and generally became known as "football analyst" with numerous appearances on TV and the radio.

He published seven books and authored a number of courses currently used at universities across the country.

Jackie Ionescu was awarded the title of "Citizen of Honour" of Timișoara.

Honours

Player
Sportul Studențesc
Liga III (1): 1958–59

Coach
Politehnica Timișoara
Cupa României (1): 1979–80
Liga II (2): 1972–73, 1983–84

References

External links
 Jackie speaks about Poli – Shakhtar match in UEFA Champions League – Romaniansoccer.ro

1936 births
Sportspeople from Timișoara
Romanian footballers
Romanian football managers
FC Politehnica Timișoara players
FC Sportul Studențesc București players
FC Politehnica Timișoara managers
Living people
FC Sportul Studențesc București managers
FC UTA Arad managers
CSM Jiul Petroșani managers
FC Progresul București managers
CSM Reșița managers
Association football midfielders